The Never Ending Tour is the popular name for Bob Dylan's endless touring schedule since June 7, 1988.

Background
The first concert of 2019 was announced on November 27, 2018. Taking place in Hyde Park, London, Dylan and his band appeared alongside Neil Young and Promise of the Real. The event was originally scheduled to be part of the British Summer Time concert series. However Barclaycard's sponsorship of the event was removed at Young's insistence. Also on November 27, concerts in Finland, Sweden and Norway were confirmed by local news outlets. 

On April 16 in Vienna Dylan spoke to the audience for the first time in over three years. He aborted "Blowin' in the Wind" before addressing an audience member taking photographs. He stated: "Take pictures or don’t take pictures. We can either play or we can pose. Okay?"

The concert on April 19 in Innsbruck was the 3,000th show of the Never Ending Tour.

At the concert in Nowlan Park, Ireland, Dylan performed a duet of the song "Will the Circle Be Unbroken?" with Neil Young.

A twenty-six date tour of North America was announced on September 9, 2019. These shows were mainly scheduled for College and University venues with Dylan also returning to the Met Philadelphia for the second year running. On September 23, a ten-date residency was announced for New York City's Beacon Theatre starting on November 23 and coming to an end on December 6, 2019. 

On October 11, the first show of the North American leg of the tour, Dylan introduced two new members of the touring band: drummer Matt Chamberlain, replacing George Receli, and additional guitarist Bob Britt, who had previously played on Time Out of Mind. The tour received extremely positive reviews with several critics describing the shows, and Dylan's singing in particular, as his best in years.

Set list
This set list is representative of the performance on April 4, 2019 in Berlin, Germany. It does not represent the set list at all concerts for the duration of the tour.

"Things Have Changed"
"It Ain't Me Babe"
"Highway 61 Revisited"
"Simple Twist of Fate"
"Cry A While"
"When I Paint My Masterpiece"
"Honest with Me"
"Tryin' to Get to Heaven"
"Scarlet Town"
"Make You Feel My Love"
"Pay in Blood"
"Like a Rolling Stone"
"Early Roman Kings"
"Don't Think Twice, It's All Right"
"Love Sick"
"Thunder on the Mountain"
"Soon After Midnight"
"Gotta Serve Somebody"
Encore
"Blowin' in the Wind"
"It Takes a Lot to Laugh, It Takes a Train to Cry"

Tour dates

Notes

References

External links
BobLinks – Comprehensive log of concerts and set lists
BobDylan.com – Bob Dylan's Official Website Tour Page
Bjorner's Still on the Road – Information on recording sessions and performances

Bob Dylan concert tours
2019 concert tours